SMZB ( pinyin: Shengming Zhi Bing) is a Chinese hardcore punk band from Wuhan.

References

Further reading

 The Guardian interviews Wu Wei
 An Interview with Wu Wei (2014)
 SMZB on their new album (2014)
 SMZB article (2015)

Chinese punk rock groups